= Little Cay =

British Virgin Island

Coordinates: 18°26′N 64°32′W

Little Cay is an island off the British Virgin Islands in the Caribbean. It lies approximately 1.5 km off the coast of Beef Island and serves an important role in its ecosystem, primarily composed of mangroves with diverse wildlife and corals. The island is currently uninhabited.
